These are the results for the boys' singles event at the 2010 Summer Youth Olympics.

Seeds

Main draw

Finals

Top half

Bottom half

Consolation draw

References
Singles draw
Consolation draw
https://archive.today/20120526200911/http://www.singapore2010.sg/public/sg2010/en.html

Tennis at the 2010 Summer Youth Olympics